The Middleweight class in the boxing competition was the third-highest weight class.  Middleweights were limited to those boxers weighing a maximum of 75 kilograms (165.3 lbs). 22 boxers qualified for this category. Like all Olympic boxing events, the competition was a straight single-elimination tournament. Both semifinal losers were awarded bronze medals, so no boxers competed again after their first loss. Bouts consisted of six rounds each. Five judges scored each bout.

Medalists

Finnegan was unable to produce a urine sample immediately after the bout for the compulsory drugs test. He drank copious amounts of beer and water, to no effect. Finnegan then attended a local restaurant for a victory meal, where, at 1:40 am, he was able to produce a sample, which proved negative.

Schedule

Preliminaries
Since boxer George Aidoo from Ghana could not compete, a new draw was made after the preliminary bouts. Simeon Georgiev from Bulgaria drew a bye.

  def. , DSQ-2
  def. , 5:0
  def. , 4:1
  def. , 5:0
  def. , 5:0
  def. , 5:0
  def. , TKO-2

Draw

References

Boxing at the 1968 Summer Olympics